The 1845 Connecticut gubernatorial election was held on April 7, 1845. Incumbent governor, Amistad lawyer and Whig nominee Roger Sherman Baldwin was re-elected, defeating former congressman and Democratic nominee Isaac Toucey with 51.00% of the vote.

General election

Candidates
Major party candidates

Roger Sherman Baldwin, Whig
Isaac Toucey, Democratic

Minor party candidates

Francis Gillette, Liberty

Results

References

1845
Connecticut
Gubernatorial